John Webb (25 March 1930 – 25 December 2006) is a South African rower. He competed in the men's coxless four event at the 1952 Summer Olympics.

References

1930 births
2006 deaths
South African male rowers
Olympic rowers of South Africa
Rowers at the 1952 Summer Olympics
Place of birth missing